László Gyöngyösi (9 September 1927 – 23 February 2016) was a Hungarian  swimmer. He competed in two events at the 1952 Summer Olympics.

References

1927 births
2016 deaths
Hungarian male swimmers
Olympic swimmers of Hungary
Swimmers at the 1952 Summer Olympics
Swimmers from Budapest